Andrew Christopher Fogarty (28 January 1884 – 29 November 1915) was an Australian rules footballer who played with Essendon and University in the Victorian Football League (VFL).

He was killed in a shell explosion in Gallipoli.

Family
One of the ten children, six boys and four girls, of the wealthy wine merchant and former Mayor of Hotham (now known as North Melbourne) Thomas Fogarty (1836–1900) and Cecilia Mary Fogarty (1854–1933), née Cullen, Chris Fogarty was born on 28 January 1884 in Hotham, Victoria. He married Mary Agnes O'Connor (sometime given as Agnes Mary O'Connor), in Hawthorn, on 7 May 1915, the day before he left Australia. Their daughter, Anne Christine Fogarty, was born in London on 5 March 1916.

Education
He was educated at St Patrick's College, Ballarat, Ormond College, and at the University of Melbourne where he first studied engineering and then transferred to a veterinary science degree.

Footballer

Four of the six Fogarty brothers played VFL football: Thomas Bernard "Tom" Fogarty (1878–1922), played for St Kilda, South Melbourne, and University for a total of 95 games; John Joseph Fogarty (1882–1952), played a single game for South Melbourne; Andrew Christopher "Chris" Fogarty (1884–1915), played for Essendon and University for a total of 28 games; and Joseph Patrick "Joe" Fogarty (1887–1954), played with South Melbourne, Essendon, and University for a total of 16 games.

His nephew, Thomas Bernard Fogarty (1909–1984), son of his brother Tom, played 13 senior VFL games for St Kilda.

Along with his brother Joe, he played football, representing Ormond College, in a combined Melbourne University team, against a combined Adelaide University team, on 8 August 1906.

Fogarty played his first senior match for Essendon, against Geelong, at the Corio Oval, on Saturday, 8 September 1906 (which Geelong won by 24 points), and his second march was in the Semi-Final on the following Saturday, against Fitzroy, where he played full-back in an Essendon team that lost by 36 points (his brother Joe also played for Essendon team in each of the matches).

He played football both for Ormond College and Melbourne University during 1907 in the Metropolitan Association, and was awarded a "blue" for football. In late 1907 the VFL agreed to admit University to its 1908 competition; and, now 24, with his brothers Tom (aged 30), who captained the team, and Joe (aged 22), Chris Fogarty played in the first competition match that the University VFL  team ever played, against Essendon, at the East Melbourne Cricket Ground, on 2 May 1908 (round one). He played well in the ruck, although his team lost by 66 points, 14.11 (95) to 3.11 (29).

He played another 25 games for University, playing his last VFL game for University, on the half-back flank, against Collingwood, at the East Melbourne Cricket Ground, on 27 August 1910 (round seventeen). University lost  the tight match by 16 points, 9.5 (59) to 10.15 (75).

Soldier
His younger brother, Major Joseph Patrick Fogarty (1885–1954), OBE, MC, of the 21st Battalion (Australian Army Medical Corps), served in AIF, in the Middle East and France during World War I. His older brother, Sergeant Thomas Bernard Fogarty (60679), a lawyer, also enlisted (on 17 July 1918).

Chris Fogarty, single, listing his occupation as grazier, enlisted in the First AIF on 26 February 1915. Having received officer training, he was promoted to Lieutenant on 22 April 1915, appointed to the 24th Battalion, AIF, and left Australia on 8 May 1915. He was killed, amongst 31 dead and 100 wounded, by a massive explosion caused by a Turkish shell barrage, on 29 November 1915, at Gallipoli. His brother, Joe, a Medical Officer with the Australian Army Medical Corps, was close at hand and heard the explosion:

A brother in law, John Maurice Orr Colahan (1894-1917), son of Surgeon-Major-General John Colahan, M.D., was killed in action on 14 October 1917.

Remembered
He is buried at the Lone Pine Cemetery, Gallipoli, Turkey; and his name is located at panel 101 in the Commemorative Area at the Australian War Memorial.

His parents installed a stained glass window in his memory at the Roman Catholic church, St Mary Star of the Sea, at West Melbourne.

See also
 List of Victorian Football League players who died in active service
 List of Australian rules football families

Footnotes

Sources
 Holmesby, Russell & Main, Jim (2007). The Encyclopedia of AFL Footballers. 7th ed. Melbourne: Bas Publishing.
 Main, J. & Allen, D., "Fogarty, Chris", pp. 65–67 in Main, J. & Allen, D., Fallen – The Ultimate Heroes: Footballers Who Never Returned From War, Crown Content, (Melbourne), 2002.
 Died on Service: Fogarty, The Argus, (Wednesday, 15 December 1915), p.1.
 Australian Casualties: 125th List Issued: Killed in Action: Victoria (Lieut. Fogarty, A. C., 24th Batt., Kew), The Argus, (Tuesday, 21 December 1915), p.8.

External links

 World War I Service record: Andrew Christopher Fogarty
 Australian War Memorial Roll of Honour: Andrew Christopher Fogarty
 Australian Australian War Memorial Roll of Honour "Circular": Andrew Christopher Fogarty
 Commonwealth War Graves Commission Casualty Details: Fogarty, Andrew Christopher
 First World War Nominal Roll: Andrew Christopher Fogarty

1884 births
Australian rules footballers from Melbourne
Essendon Football Club players
University Football Club players
1915 deaths
Australian military personnel killed in World War I
University of Melbourne alumni
People from North Melbourne
Military personnel from Melbourne